Strain 121 (Geogemma barossii) is a single-celled microbe of the domain Archaea. It was (at the time of its discovery) the only known form of life that could tolerate such high temperatures. Prior to the 2003 discovery of Strain 121, a fifteen-minute exposure to autoclave temperatures was believed to kill all living organisms. However, Strain 121 is not infectious in humans, because it cannot grow at temperatures near . Strain 121 metabolizes by reducing iron oxide.

The maximum growth temperature of strain 121 is 8 °C higher than the previous record holder, Pyrolobus fumarii (Tmax=113 °C). However, it appears highly improbable that strain 121 marks the upper limit of viable growth temperature. It may very well be the case that the true upper limit lies somewhere in the vicinity of 140 to 150 °C, the temperature range where molecular repair and resynthesis becomes unsustainable.

See also
 Methanopyrus kandleri Strain 116

References

Cowan, D. (2004). “The Upper Temperature for Life – Where Do We Draw the Line?” Trends in Microbiology (Regular Ed.), vol. 12, no. 2, Elsevier Ltd, pp. 58–60, https://doi.org/10.1016/j.tim.2003.12.002.

External links
Guardian News
Science Daily article
NSF "Microbe from Depths Takes Life to Hottest Known Limit"
How Hot is Too Hot for Earth-Style Life?

Thermoproteota
Thermophiles
Archaea described in the 21st century